Georgian Horsemen may refer to:

 Georgian horsemen in Wild West shows
 Mkhedrioni, a Georgian paramilitary group and political organisation